Anders Theodor Wallensten (born 22 January 1974 in Stockholm) is a Swedish physician and epidemiologist. He is the son of Richard Wallensten and Kerstin Uvnäs Moberg, both physicians.

He obtained his medical degree at Uppsala University in 2000, and later obtained his PhD at Linköping University in 2006 for a thesis on the Influenza A virus among wild birds. He currently serves as the Swedish deputy state epidemiologist, under state epidemiologist Anders Tegnell.

References 

Living people
1974 births
Swedish epidemiologists
21st-century Swedish physicians
Physicians from Stockholm